Münir Nurettin Selçuk (1900 or 1901 – April 27, 1981) was a Turkish classical musician and tenor singer.

Biography

He was born in the Sarıyer district of Istanbul in the Ottoman Empire in 1900 or 1901. His uncle was Grand Vizier of the Ottoman Empire, Abdurrahman Nurettin Pasha. As a youth, Selçuk studied in Hungary before returning to Turkey and becoming a musician. In 1927, he travelled to Paris for a musical education, then began working for the Istanbul Conservatory in 1953. He was the director of the Conservatory for a total of sixteen years.

Selçuk spent some time singing in stage musicals. One of Selçuk's most important legacies was the establishment of the position of lead singer in Turkish music. He died on April 27, 1981 and was buried at Aşiyan Asri Cemetery.

He had two sons, both of whom followed his footsteps into music, pianist composer Timur Selçuk, and jazz drummer composer Selim Selçuk.

Works
He appeared in the films "Üçüncü Selim'in Gözdesi" (1950), "Hasret" (1944), "Kahveci Güzeli" (1941), and "Allah'ın Cenneti" (1939), as well as composing for three films.

References
 Biyografi.net - Biography of Münir Nurettin Selçuk

External links
 

1900s births
1981 deaths
People from Sarıyer
Turkish classical composers
Turkish classical singers
20th-century Turkish male singers
Turkish male film actors
Musicians from Istanbul
Burials at Aşiyan Asri Cemetery
Composers of Ottoman classical music
Composers of Turkish makam music
Musicians of Ottoman classical music
Musicians of Turkish makam music
20th-century Turkish male actors
20th-century classical musicians
20th-century composers
Male classical composers